Lorànt Deutsch (born László Matekovics on 27 October 1975), is a French actor and writer.

Deutsch was born in Alençon to a Hungarian-Jewish father and a Romanian mother. An ardent Catholic, Deutsch says he is a royalist. 

In 2005, Deutsch met actress Marie-Julie Baup when they worked together during Amadeus. After working together for several more years while cast in The Importance of Being Earnest, they married in 2009, on 3 October, and now have three children.

Filmography

Actor
 1994: L'Eau froide by Olivier Assayas
 1997: Les Randonneurs by Philippe Harel: Jean
 1999: Le Ciel, les oiseaux et... ta mère ! by Djamel Bensalah: Christophe
 1999: Peut-être by Cédric Klapisch: Prince Fur
 2000: Là-bas, mon pays by Alexandre Arcady: Versanti
 2000: Jet Set by Fabien Onteniente: Fifi
 2000: L'Envol by Steve Suissa: Franky
 2001: Un aller simple by Laurent Heynemann: Aziz
 2001: HS Hors Service by Jean-Paul Lilienfeld
 2002: Le Raid by Djamel Bensalah: Tacchini
 2002: 3 zéros by Fabien Onteniente: Tibor Kovacs
 2003: Bienvenue chez les Rozes by Francis Palluau: Gilbert
 2003: Le Coût de la vie by Philippe Le Guay: Patrick
 2003: Ripoux 3 by Clauby Zidi: Julien
 2003: Les Clefs de bagnole by Laurent Baffie
 2004: Les Amateurs by Martin Valente: Christophe Pichon
 2004: Pour le plaisir by Dominique Deruddere: Jean
 2004: Nos amis les flics by Bob Swaim: Bénisti
 2004: L'Américain by Patrick Timsit: Francis Farge
 2005: Ze Film by Guy Jacques: Bilou
 2006: Le Temps des porte-plumes by Daniel Duval: Pierre Dubrac
 2007: Jean de La Fontaine, le défi by Daniel Vigne: Jean de La Fontaine
 2007: Big City by Djamel Bensalah
 2008: La jeune fille et les loups by Gilles Legrand: Anatole
 2008: Le Plaisir de chanter by Ilan Duran Cohen: Philippe
 2008: Home Sweet Home by Didier Le Pêcheur: the barkeeper
 2008: Mazli by Tamas Kemenyffy: Ivan
 2009: Humains by Jacques-Olivier Molon et Pierre-Olivier Thévenin: Thomas
 2010: Ailleurs by Valérie Muller
 2011: Tu seras mon fils by Gilles Legrand
 2016: Les Visiteurs: La Révolution by Jean-Marie Poiré

Voice-overs
 2001 : La Planète au trésor, un nouvel univers (Treasure Planet) by Ron Clements et John Musker voix du robot B.E.N (Bio-Electron-Navigateur)
 2003 : La méthode Bourchnikov by Grégoire Sivan (short film)
 2003 : Loulou by Serge Elissalde (short film), presented in Loulou et les autres loups
 2005 : Le Roman de Renart : Rufus (voice)
 2005 : Chicken Little : Chicken Little (voice) (dubbed by Zach Braff in the original version)
 2006 : Astérix et les Vikings by Stefan Fjeldmark et Jesper Moller : Goudurix (voice)
 2008 : Max et Co by Robert Boner and Benoît Dreyer : Max (voice)
 2009 : Kérity, la maison des contes by Dominique Monféry : le Lapin Blanc
 2009 : Cosmic Collisions, French version for the Futuroscope (Chocs Cosmiques) and the Cité des sciences et de l'industrie (Collisions cosmiques)
 2009 : La fabuleuse histoire des jeux vidéo, documentary by Charles Henry Flavigny and Alexandre de Seguins
 2010 : La Véritable Histoire des Bleus, documentary by Stéphane Benamou
 2011 : Rio by Carlos Saldanha : Blu
 2011 : Les Schtroumpfs by Raja Gosnell : le Schtroumpf à Lunettes
 2013 : Les Schtroumpfs 2 by Raja Gosnell : le Schtroumpf à Lunettes
 2014 : Rio 2 by Carlos Saldanha : Blu

Short features 
 1997 : Y a du foutage dans l'air by Djamel Bensalah
 1999 : Une heureuse rencontre by Emmanuel Paulin
 2000 : Scénario sur la drogue : Exta-ordinaire by Manuel Boursinhac
 2000 : C’est pas tous les jours marrant by Christophe Turpin
 2001 : Le Peloton by David Morlet
 2001 : Ces jours heureux by Olivier Nakache and Éric Toledano
 2001 : Ta sœur by Martin Valente
 2002 : À louer by James L. Frachon
 2009 : La Librairie de Schrödinger by Claire Vassé et Christophe Beauvais (nominations Festivals de Pantin, Angers, Gagny et Pontault-Combault)

Television
 1993 : Les Intrépides : Tom Miller
 1995 : Highlander : young Georges (1 episode) as Laurent Deutsch
 1997 : Ma voyante préférée : Djee-Gang
 1997 : Les Bœufs-Carottes : Gégé (1 episode)
 1998 : La Façon de le dire by Sébastien Grall : Nicolas
 1998 : H : Loïc Zolla, the intern (2 episodes)
 1999 : Les Hirondelles d'hiver, by André Chandelle : Peau de lapin 2000 : Le Lycée : Didier Morillon
 2000 : Les Cordier, juge et flic (épisode 34) : Nicolas
 2002 : Un Paradis pour deux : Arthur
 2002 : Caméra café : Simon (1 episode)
 2004 : Kaamelott : the Burgundian interpreter (1 episode)
 2004 : Le Triporteur de Belleville by Stéphane Kurc : Victor
 2005 : Les Amants du Flore : Jean-Paul Sartre
 2006 : L'Académie du Foot sur Arte : Narrator
 2008 : Mister Mocky présente by Jean-Pierre Mocky (1 episode)
 2009 : Facteur chance by Julien Seri : Jef
 2010 : Les Diamants de la victoire by Vincent Monnet : Théophile, vicomte de Chandrilles
 2010 : Le Roi, l'écureuil et la couleuvre by Laurent Heynemann : Fouquet
 2011 : Les livres qui tuent by Denys Granier-Deferre : Léo Schwartz-Lenoir

Theater
 La Dispute by Marivaux
 Arlequin poli par l'amour by Marivaux
 2002 : La Reine de beauté de Leenane by Martin McDonagh, staging Gildas Bourdet, Théâtre de l'Ouest Parisien
 2005 : Amadeus by Peter Shaffer, staging Stéphane Hillel, Théâtre de Paris
 2006 : L'Importance d'être constant by Oscar Wilde, staging Pierre Laville, Théâtre Antoine
 2007 : L'Importance d'être constant by Oscar Wilde, staging Pierre Laville, Théâtre Antoine
 2007 : Victor ou les enfants au pouvoir by Roger Vitrac, staging Alain Sachs, Théâtre Antoine
 2008 : L'Importance d'être constant by Oscar Wilde, staging Pierre Laville, Opéra de Massy, tournée
 2009 : L'Anniversaire by Harold Pinter, staging Michel Fagadau, Comédie des Champs-Élysées
 2009 : Le Roman d' un trader by Jean-Louis Bauer, staging Daniel Benoin, théâtre national de Nice, Théâtre de la Croix-Rousse
 2010 : Face au paradis by Nathalie Saugeon, staging Rachida Brakni, Théâtre Marigny
 2010 : Boubouroche by Philippe Uchan after Georges Courteline, staging Nicolas Briançon
 2011 : Le songe d'une nuit d'été by William Shakespeare, staging Nicolas Briançon, Festival d'Anjou, Théâtre de la Porte Saint-Martin

Books
 2009: Métronome, l'histoire de France au rythme du métro parisien'', with Emmanuel Haymann, Paris: Michel Lafon -

Sources

External links

1975 births
Living people
People from Alençon
French male film actors
French male stage actors
French male television actors
French male voice actors
French people of Hungarian-Jewish descent
French people of Romanian descent
French Roman Catholics
20th-century French male actors
21st-century French male actors
Actors from Normandy